Conception Vessel is the debut album by Paul Motian released on the ECM label in 1973. It was recorded on November 25 & 26 1972 at Butterfly and Sound Ideas Studios, New York City, and has performances by Motian with pianist Keith Jarrett (also featured on flute), bassist Charlie Haden, violinist Leroy Jenkins, guitarist  Sam Brown and flautist Becky Friend.

Reception
The Allmusic review by Ron Wynn awarded the album 4 stars, stating, "This is Motian's debut as a leader. It includes ambitious cuts with guitarist Sam Brown and also features pianist Keith Jarrett.".

Track listing
 "Georgian Bay" - 7:31  
 "Ch'i Energy" - 2:37  
 "Rebica" - 11:14  
 "Conception Vessel" - 7:46  
 "American Indian: Song of Sitting Bull" - 2:45  
 "Inspiration from a Vietnamese Lullaby" - 9:41

All compositions by Paul Motian

Personnel
Paul Motian - drums, percussion
Keith Jarrett - piano (4), flute (5)
Sam Brown - guitar (1, 3)
Leroy Jenkins - violin (6)
Becky Friend - flute (6)
Charlie Haden - bass (1, 3, 6)

References 

1973 debut albums
Paul Motian albums
ECM Records albums
Albums produced by Manfred Eicher